Fibrillithecis is a genus of lichenized fungi in the family Graphidaceae. The genus was circumscribed in 2006 by German lichenologist Andreas Frisch, with Fibrillithecis vernicosa assigned as the type species.

References

Ostropales
Lichen genera
Ostropales genera
Taxa described in 2006